This is a list of all tornadoes that were confirmed throughout Europe by the European Severe Storms Laboratory and local meteorological agencies during 2014. Unlike the United States, the original Fujita Scale and the TORRO scale are used to rank tornadoes across the continent.

European yearly total

January

January 2 event

January 3 event

January 4 event

January 13 event

January 25 event

January 31 event

February

February 1 event

February 4 event

February 12 event

February 27 event

February 28 event

March

March 3 event

March 6 event

March 23 event

March 27 event

March 28 event

March 31 event

April

April 18 event

April 19 event

April 20 event

April 29 event

April 30 event

May

May 3 event

May 10 event

May 11 event

May 13 event

May 14 event

May 15 event

May 16 event

May 19 event

May 22 event

May 23 event

May 24 event

May 25 event

May 26 event

May 27 event

May 30 event

June

June 1 event

June 2 event

June 4 event

June 7 event

June 9 event

June 10 event

June 11 event

June 12 event

June 17 event

June 18 event

June 19 event

June 23 event

June 25 event

June 25 event

June 29 event

June 30 event

July

July 5 event

July 6 event

July 9 event

July 10 event

July 11 event

July 12 event

July 13 event

July 15 event

July 20 event

July 21 event

July 22 event

July 26 event

July 27 event

July 31 event

August

August 1 event

August 2 event

August 3 event

September

External links
 

 2014
Tornadoes of 2014
Tornadoes
European tornadoes in 2014
2014-related lists